Bovina Mountain is a mountain located in the Catskill Mountains of New York east of Bloomville. Bovina Mountain is located east-northeast of Bramley Mountain and west-northwest of Mount Warren and Carmans Notch.

References

Mountains of Delaware County, New York
Mountains of New York (state)